Kjell Bertil Leonard Bergqvist (born 23 February 1953 in Enskede, Stockholm County) is a Swedish actor.

Bergqvist finished the Royal Dramatic Training Academy in 1973 and made his debut in En enkel melodi and Jack. He has since cooperated for many years with scriptwriter and director Ulf Malmros. During the 1990s he has recorded several police films playing Martin Beck's colleague Lennart Kollberg. He played two different characters in the Swedish horror television series Chock in 1997. In 2001, he got a Guldbagge Award for his lead role in Den bästa sommaren and in 2002 he was nominated for the lead role Leif in Leva livet.

Kjell was for a time married to Miss Universe 1984 winner Yvonne Ryding (Yvonne Ryding-Bergqvist; today they are divorced).

He starred in Avicii's music video Silhouettes, as the doctor. This video was released on 7 June 2012.

Selected filmography
 1979 – Katitzi
 1988 – Besökarna
 1993 – Roseanna
 1993 – The Fire Engine That Disappeared
 1993 – Murder at the Savoy
 1993 – The Man on the Balcony
 1994 – The Police Murderer
 1994 – Stockholm Marathon
 1996 - Silvermannen
 1997 - Chock (TV series)
 2000 - A Summer Tale
 2001 - Days Like This
 2003 - Evil
 2003 - Slim Susie
 2004 - Drowning Ghost
 2005 - Tjenare kungen
 2006 - Göta kanal 2 – Kanalkampen
 2009 - Bröllopsfotografen
 2013 - Waltz for Monica

References

External links

Swedish male actors
1953 births
Living people
Best Actor Guldbagge Award winners
Best Supporting Actor Guldbagge Award winners